Winter X Games IX were held from January 29, 2005 to February 1, 2005 in Aspen, Colorado.  They were the 4th consecutive Winter X Games to be held in Aspen.  Television coverage of Winter X Games XI was broadcast on ESPN and ABC, primarily hosted by Sal Masekela and Todd Harris.

Disciplines
Disciplines at the 9th Winter X Games were:

Freestyle Skiing
Motocross
Snowboarding
Snowmobiling
Ultracross

Results

Motocross
Men's Best Trick

Skiing
Men's Ski Cross

Women's Ski Cross

Men's Ski Slopestyle

Men's Ski SuperPipe

Women's Ski SuperPipe

Snowboarding
Men's Snowboard Cross

Women's Snowboard Cross

Men's Snowboard Slopestyle

Women's Snowboard Slopestyle

Men's Snowboard SuperPipe

Women's Snowboard SuperPipe

Snowmobiling
Snocross

Ultracross
Men's Combined Ultracross

References

Winter X Games
2005 in multi-sport events
2005 in American sports
Sports in Colorado
Pitkin County, Colorado
2005 in Colorado
Winter multi-sport events in the United States
International sports competitions hosted by the United States
January 2005 sports events in the United States
February 2005 sports events in the United States